Carlos Renato de Abreu (born 9 June 1978, in São Paulo), known as Renato or Renato Abreu, is a Brazilian association football centre midfielder.

Specialising in free kicks and long shots, Renato was recognised by the press and fans one of the most important players in Flamengo's triumph in the 2006 Copa do Brasil, and the Campeonato Brasileiro of the same year being named in the team of the year.

Career
Renato starts his soccer career in Santa Catarina playing at Marcílio Dias and Joinville. In 2000, he moved away to São Paulo and played for União Barbarense. A year later, Renato was transferred to Guarani.

Because of his great performances he was bought by Corinthians where he won some titles, such as Torneio Rio-São Paulo, Brazilian Cup and São Paulo State League.

In 2005, Renato arrived at Flamengo was considered one of the club's best players during his time, between 2005 and 2007. Renato has been the Flamengo's top scorer in two seasons (2005 and 2006), won the 2006 Copa do Brasil, against Vasco da Gama. During 2006 and 2007 he was the team's captain. In 2007, he continued playing well and winning championships such Taça Guanabara and Rio de Janeiro State League. But on 10 July 2007, Flamengo announced his transfer to Al-Nasr, a club in the UAE from where he moved to Al-Shabab.

In 2011, he was called up by coach Mano Menezes for the national team for the first leg of the Superclasico de las Américas against Argentina; Renato played 61 minutes and was replaced by Oscar, having a discrete participation in the eventual 0–0 draw. Brazil eventually won 2–0 on aggregate, and Renato did not play in the second leg.

Career statistics
(Correct )

according to combined sources on the Flamengo official website and Flestatística.

Honours
Corinthians
São Paulo State League: 2001, 2003
Rio-São Paulo Tournament: 2002
Copa do Brasil: 2002

Flamengo
Copa do Brasil: 2006 2013
Taça Guanabara: 2007, 2011
Taça Rio: 2011
Rio de Janeiro State League: 2007, 2011

Individual
 Campeonato Brasileiro Série A Team of the Year: 2006
 2011 Campeonato Carioca Best Defensive Central Midfielder

References

External links
Carlos Renato de Abreu at the Brazilian FA database 
CBF 

1978 births
Living people
Brazilian footballers
Sport Club Corinthians Paulista players
CR Flamengo footballers
Guarani FC players
Al-Nasr SC (Dubai) players
Al Shabab Al Arabi Club Dubai players
Santos FC players
Campeonato Brasileiro Série A players
Brazilian expatriate sportspeople in the United Arab Emirates
Brazil international footballers
Expatriate footballers in the United Arab Emirates
Footballers from São Paulo
UAE Pro League players
Association football midfielders